Refsum is a surname. Notable people with the surname include:

Helge Refsum (1897-1976), Norwegian jurist and politician
Maja Refsum (1897–1986), Norwegian sculptor and teacher
Marie Borge Refsum (born 1927), Norwegian politician
Sigvald Bernhard Refsum (1907–1991), Norwegian neurologist
Thomas Refsum (1878–1957), Norwegian sport shooter
Tor Hermod Refsum (1894–1981), Norwegian painter

See also
Refsum disease